Alfonso Calalang was the 3rd Governor of the Central Bank of the Philippines, serving from January 1, 1968, to January 9, 1970.

References

Living people
Governors of the Bangko Sentral ng Pilipinas
Ferdinand Marcos administration personnel
Year of birth missing (living people)